The Dark Tower: The Gunslinger - The Little Sisters of Eluria is a five-issue comic book limited series published by Marvel Comics. It is the seventh comic book miniseries based on Stephen King's The Dark Tower series of novels. Unlike the majority of the other comics which were based either on the novels or original material that expanded upon plot points from them, this miniseries is not based upon any of the novels, but on the novella The Little Sisters of Eluria which was published in several anthologies before being included in the 2009 revised edition of The Gunslinger. It is plotted by Robin Furth, scripted by Peter David, and illustrated by Richard Isanove and Luke Ross. Stephen King is the Creative and executive director of the project. The first issue was published on December 8, 2010.

Publication dates
Issue #1: December 8, 2010
Issue #2: January 12, 2011
Issue #3: February 9, 2011
Issue #4: March 16, 2011
Issue #5: April 13, 2011

Summary
A battle with mutants leaves Roland injured and in the care of a small, strange clinic. However, the nurses are more of a danger than the mutants ever were.

Collected editions
The entire five-issue run of The Little Sisters of Eluria was collected into a hardcover edition, released by Marvel on June 22, 2011. A paperback edition was later released on January 29, 2013. The series was also included in the hardcover release of The Dark Tower: The Gunslinger Omnibus on September 3, 2014.

See also
The Dark Tower (comics)

References

External links

Dark Tower Official Site

2010 comics debuts
Gunslinger - Little Sisters of Eluria, The